Roberto José Leal Guillén  (born 28 June 1979) is a Spanish television presenter, reporter and journalist.

Biography 
Roberto Leal was born in Alcalá de Guadaíra, Seville on 28 June 1979. Leal graduated in Journalism at the University of Seville. He was a journalist of the newspaper La Voz de Alcalá, and the conductor of the radio program La Resaca, on Sevilla FM.

His father Pepe Leal died on 27 December 2019.

Career
In 2001 at 21 he began his television career working for Telecinco's news department. After working in Canal Sur and as a news reporter with María Teresa Campos in Antena 3, from 2005 to 2010 Leal was a reporter in the infotainment show España directo, on La 1. In 2010 he co-hosted the short-lived infotainment show 3D alongside Gloria Serra on Antena 3. In the following four years, Leal continued in Antena 3 co-hosting the morning television show Espejo público, alongside Susanna Griso. On 15 September 2014, he returned to España directo, as the anchor.

From 2017 to 2020, Leal hosted the talent show Operación Triunfo on its ninth, tenth and eleventh seasons. In 2018, Leal hosted Bailando con las estrellas, the Spanish adaptation of Dancing with the Stars, alongside Rocío Muñoz Morales. On 31 December 2018, Leal presented the annual New Year's Eve celebration broadcast for TVE live from Madrid's Puerta del Sol, alongside Anne Igartiburu. In 2019, Leal hosted the music show La mejor canción jamás cantada and the game show Vaya crack.

In 2020, Leal was hired by Antena 3 to host game shows Pasapalabra and El desafío. He left the show temporarily on 31 August 2020 after testing positive for COVID-19 during the pandemic. Since 2021, he also hosts the Spanish version of Lego Masters.

Awards and honors
In July 2018 he received the Premio Andalucía del Turismo.

In 2019, a street in his hometown of Alcalá de Guadaíra was named after him.

References

External links

1979 births
Living people
People from Seville (comarca)
Spanish television personalities
Spanish television presenters